The Museu de Belles Arts de València (English: "Museum of Fine Arts of Valencia") is an art gallery in Valencia, Spain, founded in 1913. It houses some 2,000 works, most dating from the 14th–17th centuries, including a Self portrait of Diego Velázquez, a St. John the Baptist by El Greco, Goya's Playing Children, Gonzalo Pérez's Altarpiece of Sts. Ursula, Martin and Antony and a Madonna with Writing Child and Bishop by the Italian Renaissance master Pinturicchio. It houses a large series of engravings by Giovan Battista Piranesi.

The museum is in the St. Pius V Palace, built in the 17th–18th centuries. It has also sections dedicated to sculpture, to contemporary art and to archaeological findings.

Artworks

External links

Museum of Fine Arts of Valencia 

Museums in Valencia
Museums established in 1913
Belles Arts, Valencia
Tourist attractions in Valencia
1913 establishments in Spain